Hem Bunting (born December 12, 1985) is a Cambodian marathoner.

Bunting is one of nine children from a family of farmers in Stung Treng Province. The British Broadcasting Corporation has described him as "so poor he lives in the crumbling athletics stadium where he trains". He won a silver medal in the marathon and a bronze at the 5,000 metre race at the 2007 Southeast Asian Games. He represented Cambodia in the marathon at the 2008 Summer Olympics in Beijing, finishing 73rd in a time of 2:33:32.

Bunting had few facilities and little funding to prepare for the Olympics. He trained by running laps on a track simultaneously used by casual joggers, and could not afford to buy running shoes. The BBC's article on him moved one reader to send him new training shoes prior to the Beijing Olympics.

He has made a significant effort in his second Marathon outing  of 2012 after finishing in top 50 (42nd) at the Paris Marathon on April 15 with a personal best of 2:23:29. The time also improved on his previous national record 2:25:20 set during 2009 Southeast Asian Games in Vientiane where he won a bronze medal. Not only that, his official intermediate time at half marathon shows 1:09:04, which is a new national record.

Competition record

Personal bests
Outdoor
1500 m – 4:03.87 (Incheon 2005)
5000 m – 14:24.71 (Nakhon Ratchasema 2007)
Half Marathon – 1:11:47 (Khon Kaen 2008)
Marathon – 2:23:29 (Paris 2012)

Indoor
1500 m – 4:06.10 (Pattaya 2006)
3000 m – 9:02.00 (Pattaya 2006)

References

External links
 

 BBC News video about Hem Bunting

Athletes (track and field) at the 2008 Summer Olympics
Olympic athletes of Cambodia
Cambodian male marathon runners
1985 births
Living people
Athletes (track and field) at the 2006 Asian Games
Athletes (track and field) at the 2010 Asian Games
Athletes (track and field) at the 2014 Asian Games
Cambodian male middle-distance runners
Cambodian male long-distance runners
Southeast Asian Games medalists in athletics
Southeast Asian Games silver medalists for Cambodia
Southeast Asian Games bronze medalists for Cambodia
Competitors at the 2007 Southeast Asian Games
Competitors at the 2009 Southeast Asian Games
Asian Games competitors for Cambodia